The Journal of Neurochemistry is a biweekly peer-reviewed scientific journal covering all aspects of neurochemistry. It is published by Wiley-Blackwell on behalf of the International Society for Neurochemistry and was established in 1956. The editor-in-chief is Andrew J. Lawrence (University of Melbourne).

According to the Journal Citation Reports, the journal has a 2020 impact factor of 5.372.

Abstracting and indexing
The journal is abstracted and indexed in:

Editors-in-chief

The following persons have been editor-in-chief of the journal:

References

External links
 

Neuroscience journals
Wiley-Blackwell academic journals
Publications established in 1956
English-language journals
Semi-monthly journals